AmaBhungane Centre for Investigative Journalism is an investigative journalism organisation focusing primarily on exposing political corruption in South Africa and neighbouring countries. They say that their name means “dung beetles” in isiZulu, one of the indigenous languages of South Africa. They claim they are “digging dung, fertilising democracy.”

Their “#GuptaLeaks” investigations have produced many stories over the years that exposed substantive political corruption in the South African government, recognised by several prestigious awards for investigative journalism. These reports suggested that the Gupta family had ”captured the state” through their friendship with then-President Jacob Zuma and seem to have contributed to 2016 electoral defeats by the ANC in South Africa's largest cities, the defeat of Zuma as president of the African National Congress on 18 December 2017, and then to Zuma's resignation as head of state on 14 February 2018. They've also contributed to the Paradise Papers exposé and many other reports relating to the South African political economy.

Budget 

Their budget for two representative years is summarised in the following table.

Awards 

The following include only a few of the awards presented to amaBhungane and members of their team:

 19 March 2018: “19 journalists from AmaBhungane, the Daily Maverick and News24, won the 2017 Taco Kuiper Award for their excellent investigative journalism into the Gupta email leaks, also known as the #GuptaLeaks.” Taco Kuiper is reportedly South Africa's biggest investigative journalism award.
 16 November 2017: AmaBhungane shared the 2017 Vodacom Journalist of the Year Award in the financial / economic category with the Daily Maverick and News24 for the #GuptaLeaks series.
 28 June 2017: Susan Comrie and Craig McKune, investigators from AmaBhungane, won the 2016 Sanlam Financial Journalist of the Year and Online Financial Journalist of the Year awards, respectively.

See also 
 Mass surveillance in South Africa

Notes 

Investigative journalism
Corruption in South Africa
2010 establishments in South Africa
Non-profit organisations based in South Africa